The Vils is a river in Bavaria, Germany.

Its source is near Freihung. It is approx.  long. It flows generally south through the towns Vilseck, Amberg and Schmidmühlen. It is a right tributary of the Naab in Kallmünz.

See also
List of rivers of Bavaria

References

Rivers of Bavaria
East Bavaria
Rivers of Germany